Charles Henry Aldrich (August 28, 1850 – April 13, 1929) was an American politician who served as a Solicitor General of the United States.

He attended the University of Michigan and received his A.B. in 1875. The University also awarded Charles an honorary masters in 1893. Admitted to the bar in 1876, Aldrich established a practice in Fort Wayne, Indiana for 10 years. He then moved to Chicago, where he maintained his practice from 1886 up until his appointment to U.S. Solicitor General.

In March 1892, Aldrich was appointed Solicitor General in place of William Howard Taft, who had just been appointed judge of the Circuit Court of Appeals for the Sixth Circuit. During his time as Solicitor General, Aldrich notably litigated the debated lives of United States patents, which principally involved telephone and electric light companies. He held the position until May 1893.

Aldrich returned to private practice after his service in the Office of the Solicitor General. Aldrich's achievements also included his leadership in various legal organizations, including president of the Chicago Law Club, member of the Chicago, Illinois and American Bar Associations, trustee of the Chicago Law Institute, and Vice President of the Union League Club.

Aldrich was married to Helen Roberts on October 13, 1875. The couple had two children, Charles H. Aldrich, Jr. and Helen Aldrich Hare.

He died on April 13, 1929 in Chicago, aged 78, and was interred near his hometown in Orland, Indiana.

External links
 
 

1850 births
1929 deaths
Politicians from Chicago
Indiana lawyers
Lawyers from Chicago
United States Solicitors General
University of Michigan alumni
People from LaGrange County, Indiana
People from Orland, Indiana
People from Fort Wayne, Indiana
19th-century American lawyers